Mirsad "Žvaka" Baljić (born 4 March 1962) is a Bosnian retired football player who played as an offensive full-back.

He got his nickname Žvaka (chewing gum) for his constant use of chewing gum during matches.

Club career
Baljić made his first football steps in hometown club Sarajevo's youth team before temporarily leaving football because of medical problems. When he returned, he went to city rivals Željezničar, and as one of their more talented youngsters, he got the opportunity to play in the first team. His league debut came in 1980 when he was aged 18. His biggest success at the club was reaching the UEFA Cup semi-finals in the 1984–85 season under the guidance of Ivica Osim.  

In 1988, Baljić moved to Swiss side Sion and stayed there until 1992, before leaving to join Zürich. After two seasons there he left to Luzern. Baljić finished his career at Locarno in 1995.

International career
Baljić played in the youth, under-21 and olympic teams of Yugoslavia. 

He made his senior debut for Yugoslavia in a March 1984 friendly game against Hungary and has earned a total of 29 caps, scoring 2 goals. Baljić was part of the UEFA Euro 1984 and 1990 FIFA World Cup Yugoslav squads. His final international was a June 1990 FIFA World Cup match against West Germany.

Personal life
Baljić lives and works in Switzerland. His son Omar is also a footballer, and has played for the Swiss national youth teams.

Honours

Player
Sion
Nationalliga A: 1991–92
Swiss Cup: 1990–91

Yugoslavia
Summer Olympics third place: 1984

References

External sources 

 Serbian national football team website

1962 births
Living people
Footballers from Sarajevo
Association football fullbacks
Yugoslav footballers
Yugoslavia international footballers
Bosnia and Herzegovina footballers
UEFA Euro 1984 players
1990 FIFA World Cup players
Olympic footballers of Yugoslavia
Olympic medalists in football
Olympic bronze medalists for Yugoslavia
Footballers at the 1984 Summer Olympics
Medalists at the 1984 Summer Olympics
FK Željezničar Sarajevo players
FC Sion players
FC Zürich players
FC Luzern players
FC Locarno players
Yugoslav First League players
Swiss Super League players
Swiss Challenge League players
Yugoslav expatriate footballers
Expatriate footballers in Switzerland
Yugoslav expatriate sportspeople in Switzerland
Bosnia and Herzegovina expatriate footballers
Bosnia and Herzegovina expatriate sportspeople in Switzerland